is a Japanese holding company established on April 1, 2009, after the stock transfer from Meiji Seika and Meiji Dairies and is the fourth largest confectionery company in the world.

Reorganization
Meiji Holdings held a press conference on September 14, 2010, and announced the reorganization of the Meiji Group. On April 1, 2011, Meiji Holdings reorganized Meiji Seika and Meiji Dairies to a food company, Meiji Co., Ltd., and a pharmaceutical company, Meiji Seika Pharma Co., Ltd.; Meiji Dairies took over the food and healthcare business of Meiji Seika to form Meiji Co., and Meiji Seika was renamed Meiji Seika Pharma Co., Ltd. According to the International Cocoa Organization, Meiji is the 4th largest confectionery producer in the world.

References

External links

Food and drink companies based in Tokyo
Holding companies based in Tokyo
Japanese companies established in 2009
Holding companies established in 2009
Food and drink companies established in 2009
Companies listed on the Tokyo Stock Exchange